Percy Astins (22 February 1888 – 1 March 1963) was a British trade unionist and politician.

Astins became active in the London United Society of Plate Printers, and served as its final general secretary.  In 1919, he took the union into a merger with the Printing Machine Managers' Trade Society, and began working part-time as an official for the larger union.  He was also active in the Labour Party, standing unsuccessfully in Bury St Edmunds at the 1929 United Kingdom general election, and in Ilford at the 1931 and 1935 United Kingdom general elections.  He did succeed in winning election to Essex County Council, spending several years as the council's chairman.

In 1945, Astins became the full-time general secretary of the Printing Machine Managers' Trade Society.  Ten years later, he took the union into a merger with the London Society of Compositors.  That union was renamed as the "London Typographical Society", and Astins served as its joint general secretary for a year before he retired.

In retirement, Astins continued to serve as an alderman on Essex County Council, and was also chair of the governors of Essex Technical College, and a magistrate.

In 1947, Astins was made a Commander of the Order of the British Empire.

References

1888 births
1963 deaths
Councillors in Essex
General secretaries of British trade unions
General Secretaries of the London Typographical Association
Labour Party (UK) councillors
Labour Party (UK) parliamentary candidates